Entomacrodus marmoratus, also called marbled blenny or pāo'o in Hawaiian, is a species of blenny endemic to Hawaii.

References

marmoratus
Fish of Hawaii
Fish of the Pacific Ocean